A seraglio, serail, seray or saray (from , via Turkish, Italian and French) is a castle, palace or government building which was considered to have particular administrative importance in various parts of the former Ottoman Empire.

"The Seraglio" may refer specifically to the Topkapı Palace, the residence of the former Ottoman sultans in Istanbul (known as Constantinople in English at the time of Ottoman rule).
The term can also refer to other traditional Turkish palaces (every imperial prince had his own) and other grand houses built around courtyards.

Etymology 
The term seraglio, from Italian, has been used in English since 1581. 
The Italian Treccani dictionary gives two derivations:

The term may also be spelt serail, via French influence, based on the Italian term.

Harem 

Since the Topkapı Palace's harem (commonly known as "The Seraglio harem") grew in prominence and fame, the term saray/serail/seraglio began also being commonly used as a synonym of harem, the sequestered living quarters used by wives and concubines in an Ottoman household.

In Ottoman culture 

Besides the Topkapı Palace ("The Seraglio"), the most famous seray is the Grand Serail in Lebanon, which is the headquarters of the prime minister. It is situated atop a hill in downtown Beirut a few blocks away from the Lebanese Parliament. The hill was the site of an Ottoman army base from the 1840s, which was built up, fortified, and expanded in the 1850s. At first it was known as al quishla, from the Turkish word kışla, meaning barracks.

Other examples include:
 the Grand Serail of Aleppo, in Syria; a French construction inspired to the Ottoman tradition.
 the Red Serail of Tripoli, in Libya. Located in central Tripoli, it also houses a museum.
 the new presidential palace of Turkey, completed in 2014, popularly called Ak Saray ("White Palace").

In Italy 
In modern Italian the word is spelled . It may refer to a wall or structure, either for defence — such as the Serraglio of Villafranca di Verona, a defensive wall built by the Scaligeri — or for containment, for example of caged wild animals. The ghettoes established in many Italian cities following the promulgation by Pope Paul IV in 1555 of the papal bull Cum nimis absurdum were initially called , .

Seraglio is also the name of the artificial island on which Mantua is located.

In popular culture
In the context of the turquerie fashion, the seraglio became the subject of works of art, the most famous perhaps being Mozart's Singspiel, Die Entführung aus dem Serail (The Abduction from the Seraglio). In Montesquieu's Persian Letters, one of the main characters, a Persian from the city of Isfahan, is described as an occupant of a seraglio.

Homophones 
Saraya is also used as a military unit title in the Arab world. The etymology is also different from the building: The etymology of سرية is from Arabic and communicates the idea of a "private group".

Another example is the Syrian Defense Saraya.

See also 

 Caravanserai, another word involving saray, is an inn or rest stop for caravans
 Sarayburnu (also known as Seraglio Point)
 Grand Serail in Beirut, Lebanon, now the office of the prime minister of Lebanon
 The Abduction from the Seraglio, opera singspiel by Mozart

Notes and references

Notes

References

Bibliography 
 

 
Ottoman culture
Concubines of the Ottoman Empire
Harem

ar:سراي